Rudolf Hermann Arndt Kohlrausch (November 6, 1809 in Göttingen – March 8, 1858 in Erlangen) was a German physicist.

Biography
He was a native of Göttingen, the son of the Royal Hanovarian director general of schools Friedrich Kohlrausch. He was a high-school teacher of mathematics and physics successively at Lüneburg, Rinteln, Kassel and Marburg. In 1853 he became an associate professor at the University of Marburg, and four years later, a full professor of physics at the University of Erlangen.

Research
In 1854 Kohlrausch introduced the relaxation phenomena, and used the stretched exponential function to explain relaxation effects of a discharging Leyden jar (capacitor). In an 1855 experiment (published 1857) with Wilhelm Weber (1804–1891), he demonstrated that the ratio of electrostatic to electromagnetic units produced a number similar to the value of the speed of light. This finding was instrumental towards Maxwell's conjecture that light is an electromagnetic wave. Also, the first usage of the letter "c" to denote the speed of light was published in an 1856 paper by Kohlrausch and Weber.

Family
He was the father of physicist Friedrich Kohlrausch.

Published works 
 Elektrodynamische Maaßbestimmungen : insbesondere Zurückführung der Stromintensitäts-Messungen auf mechanisches Maass (with Wilhelm Weber) 1857. "Electrodynamic Measurements, Especially Attributing Mechanical Units to Measures of Current Intensity". German text. English translation

References

See also
Kohlrausch function

External links

1858 deaths
1809 births
Scientists from Göttingen
19th-century German physicists
Academic staff of the University of Erlangen-Nuremberg
Academic staff of the University of Marburg